Orazio Fidani (1610 – after 1656), was a native of Florence. He was a pupil of Giovanni Biliverti, whose style he imitated. Several of his pictures are to be found in Florence, among which may be named The Four Doctors and The Four Evangelists in the church of the Chartreuse. The Corsini Gallery possesses two portraits.

References

 

1610 births
Year of death missing
17th-century Italian painters
Italian male painters
Painters from Florence
Italian Baroque painters